Mike Vaughan (born October 2, 1954) is an American former football player who was an offensive lineman for the Oklahoma Sooners football team of the University of Oklahoma from 1973 to 1976.  Vaughan was recognized as a consensus first-team All-American following his 1976 senior season.  He was picked in the fourth round of the 1977 NFL Draft by the New York Giants.

References

1954 births
Living people
All-American college football players
American football offensive linemen
Oklahoma Sooners football players
People from Chickasha, Oklahoma
Players of American football from Oklahoma